Lao Feng Xiang is one of the oldest Chinese jewellery brands in existence, spanning 174 years of continuous operation.

The first Lao Feng Xiang Jewelry Shop opened in 1848, the twenty-eighth year of reign of Daoguang Emperor in Qing dynasty. The locations were Dadongmen, Nanshi and Shanghai.  At this time, the store was named Feng Xiang Jewelry Shop.

Lao Feng Xiang's name consists of three Chinese characters representing the Phoenix, symbolizing rebirth.

Retail Stores 
LFX operates over 3,000 stores worldwide, including stores in almost every province in mainland China. The company also operates flagship international stores in New York City on 5th Avenue, in Sydney, Australia and Vancouver, British Columbia and Canada. In 2015, five new stores were opened in Hong Kong.

References

External links 
http://laofengxiang.com/
http://www.lfxjewelry.ca/

Office supply companies of China
Jewellery companies of China
Companies based in Shanghai
Retail companies established in 1848
Chinese brands
1848 establishments in China